Heydarabad-e Kahnuj or Heidar Abad Kahnooj may refer to:
 Heydarabad-e Kahnuj, Anbarabad
 Heydarabad-e Kahnuj, Faryab